The 2019 Quetzaltenango mayoral election were held on 16 June 2019.

The elections were held next to the presidential, legislative, municipal and Central American Parliament elections. Twenty candidates were presented.

The previous mayor, Luis Grijalva Minera, did not run for re-election due to possible cases of corruption, as well as ideological discrepancies with the party that postulated him.

Results

References

Elections in Guatemala